Celastrina lavendularis, the plain hedge blue, is a small butterfly found in Sri Lanka, India, and Indomalayan realm that belongs to the lycaenids or blues family.

Description

Taxonomy
The butterfly was earlier known as Lycaenopsis lavendularis Moore.

Range
It is found in Sri Lanka, India and Yunnan.

See also
List of butterflies of India
List of butterflies of India (Lycaenidae)

References

 
 

Celastrina
Fauna of Pakistan
Butterflies of Asia
Butterflies described in 1877